Nicolás Covatti (born 19 June 1988) is an Argentine motorcycle speedway rider. He rides under an Italian licence and qualifies for the Italian national team and is a six times national champion of Italy and five times national champion of Argentina.

Biography
Born in Coronel Pringles, Argentina, Covatti first came to the attention of the speedway public when he raced in the 2012 Speedway Grand Prix of Italy and was then signed up to ride for the Birmingham Brummies in the Elite League just days later. He continued to ride for Birmingham the following year in the Elite League but suffered a broken wrist while riding as a wildcard in the Italian Grand Prix and lost his place; He was not included in the team for the 2014 season. After the team made a poor start to the season Covatti returned to Birmingham in May, replacing the British rider Edward Kennett. With the Brummies folding during the season, Covatti joined Premier League team Sheffield Tigers in August.

Also in 2014, Covatti represented Italy in the Speedway World Cup. He was given a wildcard entry to the GP Challenge in Lonigo, and narrowly missed out on qualification for the 2015 SGP series, finishing in 5th place.

In 2018, Covatti signed again for the Ipswich Witches at the beginning of the season and then later in the season, he signed for Somerset Rebels after the controversial departure of Charles Wright.

See also
 Italy national speedway team
 List of Speedway Grand Prix riders

References

1988 births
Argentine speedway riders
Italian speedway riders
Living people
Birmingham Brummies riders
Sheffield Tigers riders
People from Coronel Pringles
Sportspeople from Buenos Aires Province